The Tasmanian Government Railways A class was a class of 4-4-0 steam locomotives operated by the Tasmanian Government Railways.

History
In 1892 the Tasmanian Government Railways took delivery of six A class locomotives from Beyer, Peacock & Co, Manchester. A further two followed in 1902. In 1908, A2 and A4 were rebuilt with Belpaire boilers and enlarged fireboxes, five more followed between 1927 and 1932, with the last converted in 1946. They were relegated to lesser duties following the arrival of the R class in 1923. All were withdrawn in the 1950s after the X class entered service. Seven were scrapped in 1956 with A4 plinthed in Launceston City Park. In August 1990, it was acquired by the Don River Railway.

References

Beyer, Peacock locomotives
Railway locomotives introduced in 1892
Steam locomotives of Tasmania
3 ft 6 in gauge locomotives of Australia
4-4-0 locomotives